Tommy Robison is a former player in the National Football League.

Biography
Robison was born Tommy Levell Robison, Jr. on November 17, 1961 in Merkel, Texas.

Career
Robison was drafted by the Cleveland Browns from the Houston Gamblers in the second round of the 1984 NFL Supplemental Draft of USFL and CFL players. He would go on to play for the Green Bay Packers during the 1987 NFL season and the Atlanta Falcons during the 1989 NFL season.

He played at the collegiate level at Texas A&M University.

See also
List of Green Bay Packers players

References

People from Taylor County, Texas
Green Bay Packers players
Atlanta Falcons players
Texas A&M University alumni
Texas A&M Aggies football players
Living people
1961 births